Doory Hall is an estate and now-ruined historic building in County Longford, Ireland. While some parts of the estate (including a number of its outbuildings) are included on Longford County Council's Record of Protected Structures, the 19th century manor house itself is now a largely empty "shell".

The estate was the home of the Jessop family, for whom the house was extensively remodeled by the architect John Hargrave . Doory Hall was the birthplace of the playwright George H. Jessop (1852–1915).

References 

Buildings and structures in County Longford